Acacia kelleri is a shrub or tree belonging to the genus Acacia and the subgenus Juliflorae that is endemic to north western Australia.

Description
The light to dark brown branchlets are terete and woolly.
It blooms from March to October producing yellow flowers.

Taxonomy
The plant was first formally described by the botanist Ferdinand von Mueller in 1892 as part of the work Observations on plants, collected during Mr Joseph Bradshaw's expedition to the Prince Regent's river published in Proceedings of the Linnean Society of New South Wales. The species was reclassified as Racosperma kelleri in 2003 by Leslie Pedley then transferred back to the genus Acacia in 2006.

The type specimen was collected by Joseph Bradshaw in 1891 near Prince Regent River.

Distribution
It is native to an area in the Northern Territory and the Kimberley region of Western Australia where it is found on rocky escarpments and stony creek beds growing in skeletal soils over sandstone.

See also
 List of Acacia species

References

kelleri
Acacias of Western Australia
Flora of the Northern Territory
Plants described in 1892
Taxa named by Ferdinand von Mueller